One Minute Please is a panel quiz show hosted by Ernie Kovacs aired on the DuMont Television Network from 6 July 1954 to 17 February 1955 on Tuesdays at 9pm ET.

Panelists were given a topic and had to talk about the subject for one minute nonstop. The panelist who talked the most was the winner.

See also
List of programs broadcast by the DuMont Television Network
List of surviving DuMont Television Network broadcasts
1954-55 United States network television schedule

References

Bibliography
David Weinstein, The Forgotten Network: DuMont and the Birth of American Television (Philadelphia: Temple University Press, 2004) 
Alex McNeil, Total Television, Fourth edition (New York: Penguin Books, 1980) 
Tim Brooks and Earle Marsh, The Complete Directory to Prime Time Network TV Shows, Third edition (New York: Ballantine Books, 1964)

External links
One Minute Please at IMDB
DuMont historical website

DuMont Television Network original programming
1954 American television series debuts
1955 American television series endings
1950s American game shows
Black-and-white American television shows
Lost television shows
Panel games